Vingleia Lighthouse is a coastal lighthouse in the municipality of Frøya in Trøndelag county, Norway. It is lit from 21 July until 16 May each year. It is not lit during the summer due to the midnight sun of the region.

Current tower
The lighthouse was built in 1985 to replace the previous tower that was built in 1921. The tower emits a white, red, or green light (depending on direction), occulting twice every 8 seconds.

Old tower
The original tower was built in 1921. It was painted white with a red roof. It was closed in 1985 when the new tower was built next to it. The old tower was renovated and is now available to rent as a vacation home.

See also

 List of lighthouses in Norway
 Lighthouses in Norway

References

External links
 Norsk Fyrhistorisk Forening 
 

Lighthouses completed in 1921
Lighthouses completed in 1985
Froan
Lighthouses in Trøndelag